Macaria sexmaculata, known by the common names green larch looper,  larch looper or six-spotted angle, is a moth of the  family Geometridae. It is found from Alaska to Nunavut and Newfoundland, south in the east to Massachusetts and south in the west to Oregon.

The wingspan is 16–24 mm. Adults are on wing from June to August. There are one to two generations per year.

The larvae of ssp. sexmaculata feed on Larix laricina and Larix decidua. Larvae of ssp. incolorata have been recorded on Larix occidentalis and Pseudotsuga.

Subspecies
Macaria sexmaculata sexmaculata (Newfoundland, Labrador, Alberta, Massachusetts, Connecticut, New York, Maryland, Michigan, North Dakota)
Macaria sexmaculata incolorata (Alberta to British Columbia, northern Idaho, western Montana, Washington, Oregon)

External links
Image
Bug Guide
Description of the Larval Stage

Macariini
Insects of the Arctic
Taxa named by Alpheus Spring Packard
Moths described in 1867